Normandale is a semi-rural suburb of Lower Hutt City, New Zealand, on the western hills of the Hutt Valley. It consists of two main roads – Normandale Road and Miromiro Road – and the hills between, and is a five minute drive from the Lower Hutt city centre.

Normandale contains historic woodland reserve Jubilee Park and part of Belmont Regional Park, Wellington's largest Regional Park. It also has many other smaller sections of native bush reserve, so native birds are very common; since 2019 Kiwibank has funded the suburb to suppress bird-killing predators as part of New Zealand's Predator Free project. Normandale is home to a primary school, a Playcentre, a church, a cattery, and a dog boarding kennel, and is otherwise entirely residential. As an older suburb made up entirely of narrow and steep hills, it is dominated by trees.

Geography

Normandale is defined by the area bordered by its two main roads: Normandale Road, starting with the bridge from Alicetown over State Highway 2 / Western Hutt Road and the Melling railway line; and Miromiro Road, which branches off after the bridge. Normandale Road is almost 4.5 kilometers long, whose top few kilometres, at around 200m altitude, serves small farms and lifestyle blocks. It connects north to Sweetacres Drive, Belmont. From the top of Miromiro Road, Dowse Drive connects upward to Normandale's pair suburb Maungaraki, with Poto Road connecting back down to Normandale Road in the opposite direction. The other connecting roads meet Normandale Road: Pokohiwi Road to Pekanga Road in the middle, and Cottle Park Drive and Stratton Street at the upper end bordering Belmont Regional Park.

Jubilee Park

Jubilee Park opened in 1940 to commemorate Wellington's centenary (and the 50th anniversary of Lower Hutt a year later). Mostly consisting of native bush (and the birds who live there), it also includes sites of houses built in the 1890s, a replica pioneer hut with the original chimney, heritage plantings, picnic areas, bush walks, three lawns, and a roadside calisthenics station.

Jubilee Park contains Hutt Minoh Friendship House, a Heritage New Zealand category 1 building. Originally named Norbury, it was built in 1904 by Lower Hutt's first mayor William Fitzherbert, to house his daughter Alice and her husband George William von Zedlitz, Victoria University's first professor of modern languages. It was acquired by the City Council in 1945 to house the park caretaker. Today it is used to promote Japanese culture and Lower Hutt's link with its sister city Minoh, Osaka, whose mayor funded its restoration. It includes New Zealand's first kyūdō dojo.

History

Old Coach Road
Māori used two major routes between Porirua Harbour and Wellington Harbour. One of these, called the Old Coach Road by the Pākehā settlers, ran from the Pauatahanui arm of Porirua Harbour south over the hills, exiting through what is now Normandale, into the Hutt Valley. It was a proposed road connection between the two harbours in the 1850s, and was used by coaches until the mid 1880s when it was abandoned in preference to the Haywards Hill Road. Today Old Coach Road is part of the track system in Belmont Regional Park, and the section between the sealed Stratton Street end and Belmont Road junction is a Heritage New Zealand category 2 area.

Founding and development of the suburb
Normandale was founded in 1901 under the village settlement scheme of the Liberal Government, New Zealand's first political party government, along with its westerly neighbours Maungaraki and Korokoro. It was named after Ann Normandale, mother-in-law of Richard Seddon. It was initially part of Hutt County, and became a part of Lower Hutt City on 6 October 1957.

Substantial development took place during the 1960s and 1970s. The population was stable between 1996 and 2013, with few new dwellings and a decline in the average number of residents per dwelling.

Demographics

Normandale had a population of 2,010 at the 2018 New Zealand census, an increase of 72 people (3.7%) since the 2013 census, and an increase of 69 people (3.6%) since the 2006 census. There were 723 households. There were 1,002 males and 1,011 females, giving a sex ratio of 0.99 males per female. The median age was 38.7 years (compared with 37.4 years nationally), with 417 people (20.7%) aged under 15 years, 315 (15.7%) aged 15 to 29, 1,065 (53.0%) aged 30 to 64, and 213 (10.6%) aged 65 or older.

Ethnicities were 87.2% European/Pākehā, 7.2% Māori, 3.1% Pacific peoples, 11.0% Asian, and 2.2% other ethnicities (totals add to more than 100% since people could identify with multiple ethnicities).

The proportion of people born overseas was 24.9%, compared with 27.1% nationally.

Although some people objected to giving their religion, 56.7% had no religion, 33.1% were Christian, 0.9% were Hindu, 0.1% were Muslim, 0.6% were Buddhist and 2.5% had other religions.

Of those at least 15 years old, 609 (38.2%) people had a bachelor or higher degree, and 129 (8.1%) people had no formal qualifications. The median income was $51,000, compared with $31,800 nationally. The employment status of those at least 15 was that 993 (62.3%) people were employed full-time, 231 (14.5%) were part-time, and 54 (3.4%) were unemployed.

Education

Views

References

External links
Normandale Residents Association
Normandale School

Suburbs of Lower Hutt
Heritage New Zealand Category 1 historic places in the Wellington Region